The Robert Frost House is an historic house in Cambridge, Massachusetts. It consists of four wood-frame townhouses,  stories in height, arranged in mirror image styling. Each pair of units has a porch providing access to those units, supported by turned posts and with a low Stick style balustrade. The Queen Anne/Stick style frame house was built in 1884, and has gables decorated with a modest amount of Gothic-style bargeboard.  The house was home to poet Robert Frost for the last two decades of his life.

The house was listed on the National Register of Historic Places in 1982. It remains a private home.

See also
National Register of Historic Places listings in Cambridge, Massachusetts
The Frost Place in Franconia, NH
Robert Frost Farm (Derry, New Hampshire)
Robert Frost Farm (Ripton, Vermont)

References

Houses on the National Register of Historic Places in Cambridge, Massachusetts
Robert Frost
Houses completed in 1884
Queen Anne architecture in Massachusetts
Stick-Eastlake architecture in the United States
Frost, Robert House
1884 establishments in Massachusetts